The 2003 CFL Draft took place on Wednesday, April 30, 2003. 53 players were chosen for Canadian Football League teams from among the eligible CIS football players from Canadian universities, as well as Canadian players playing in the NCAA. Of the 53 draft selections, 32 players were drafted from Canadian Interuniversity Sport institutions.

Notably, the Calgary Stampeders had the first and second overall picks in the draft, which was only the third time in CFL Draft history that a team had the first two selections in a draft. The Toronto Argonauts were the first to accomplish this via trade in the 1982 CFL Draft and the Ottawa Renegades had done this the year before as they were awarded the first and second overall selections as an expansion team in the 2002 CFL Draft.

Trades
In the explanations below, (D) denotes trades that took place during the draft, while (PD) indicates trades completed pre-draft. This is a partial list due to references being limited.

Round one
 Ottawa → Edmonton (PD). Ottawa traded a first-round selection to Edmonton in exchange for Darren Davis.
 Edmonton ←→ Calgary (PD). Edmonton traded the first overall selection and the 43rd overall selection to Calgary in exchange for the fourth overall selection and Deitan Dubuc.
 Toronto → Calgary (PD). Toronto traded the fourth overall selection to Calgary in a trade for the playing rights to Michael Bishop.
 Saskatchewan → Calgary (PD). Saskatchewan traded the fifth overall selection to Calgary in exchange for Travis Moore and Chris Hoople.
 Winnipeg → Calgary (PD). Winnipeg traded the seventh overall selection to Calgary in a trade for Pat Barnes.

Round two
 Hamilton → Calgary (PD). Hamilton traded a second-round selection to Calgary in exchange for Ryan Ward.

Round five
 Edmonton → Calgary (PD). Edmonton traded the 43rd overall selection and the first overall selection to Calgary in exchange for the fourth overall selection and Deitan Dubuc.

Draft order

Round one

Round two

Round three

Round four

Round five

Round six

References

Canadian College Draft
Cfl Draft, 2003